Alto Golf and Country Club is a golf and country club resort complex located in Portugal’s Western Algarve. The resort contains landscaped gardens with villas, apartments and townhouses, which offer views of the sea, the golf course or the gardens.

The resort's 18 hole, par 72 golf course, was the last to be designed by the legendary English golfer, Sir Henry Cotton. The course, which measures 6125 metres from the back tees, spans across two gently sloping valleys and has winding fairways and elevated greens. The opening nine holes overlook the bay of Lagos, while the back nine is set on rolling slopes. The golf course no longer forms part of Alto Golf & Country Club, being now owned and managed by the Pestana Group.

Score Card

See also
 List of golf courses in Portugal

References

External links
Alto Golf and Country Club – official site

Golf clubs and courses in Portugal
Buildings and structures in the Algarve